Roman Boianciuc (sometimes Boiangiuc) (7 November 1912, Vășcăuți, Russian Empire - 2009?) was one of the most important Romanian luthiers. In 1951 he founded the state-owned Hora (company) in the city of Reghin. He was a disciple of Alexandru Apăteanu (b. 1886, Dorohoi), who in turn learned the violin from Anton Uhlschmidt of Schönbach (Zdislava, Czech Republic). The font used by them was that of the Stradivarius violins, with yellow or red oil varnish.

In 2010 he was declared post-mortem a citizen of honor of Reghin.

References

Romanian luthiers
1912 births
2000s deaths
Soviet emigrants to Romania